Malokurilskoye is a village (selo) in Yuzhno-Kurilsky District of Sakhalin Oblast, Russia. Population: 1,100 (2007), and 1,873 (2010).

It was founded in 1933.  Postal code: 694520.  Dialing code: +7 42455.

Ostrovnoy canning factory is the main employer in the village.

Landmarks
In 2005, on the 60th anniversary of the Soviet Annexation of the Kuril Islands at the end of World War 2, an IS-2 tank was installed.

Transportation
Connected by a  road with the village of Krabozavodskoye. On January 1, 2016, for the first time in history of the island, public transport began to operate on it - the bus "s.Krabozavodskoye - Malokurilskoye." The route is served by two PAZ buses owned by Shikotansky Vodokanal LLC.

Gallery

References

External links
Official website of the "Ostrovnoy" Canning Factory 

Rural localities in Sakhalin Oblast